Barbolini is an Italian surname. Notable people with the surname include:

Giorgio Barbolini (born 1934), Italian footballer
Giuliano Barbolini (born 1945), Italian politician
Massimo Barbolini (born 1964), Italian volleyball coach

See also
Bartolini

Italian-language surnames